Liu Miaomiao (born 1989) is a Paralympian athlete from China competing mainly in category F12 long jump events.

She competed in the 2008 Summer Paralympics in Beijing, China. There she won a bronze medal in the women's F12 long jump event.

External links
 

1989 births
Paralympic athletes of China
Athletes (track and field) at the 2008 Summer Paralympics
Paralympic bronze medalists for China
Living people
Chinese female long jumpers
Medalists at the 2008 Summer Paralympics
Paralympic medalists in athletics (track and field)
21st-century Chinese women